Crithe cassidiformis is a species of very small sea snail, a marine gastropod mollusk or micromollusk in the family Cystiscidae.

Distribution
This marine species occurs off the Maldives.

References

Cassidiformis
Cystiscidae
Gastropods described in 2018